Danny Kushmaro (born 10 May 1968) is an Israeli journalist, news anchor and television presenter.

Biography
Danny Kushmaro was born in Beer Sheva and grew up in the southern region of Israel. His parents immigrated to Israel from Romania in the 1960s.

He served in the Israeli Navy and was a major in the reserves. Afterwards, he studied engineering and business administration at the Ben-Gurion University of the Negev. During this period, he wrote for the newspaper Hadashot.

Kushmaro has a spouse and two sons. He is a passionate motorcyclist. In June 2018, he was in a serious motorcycle accident in Modena, Italy.

Media and journalism career
He started his career presenting at a local radio station in 1996. In 2001, he moved to the Israeli News Company. From 2003 to 2013, he presented Channel 2's Saturday news magazine. In 2008, he became the evening anchorman after Gadi Sukenik left. He and Yonit Levi alternately host the main news broadcast on weekdays. In 2012, he replaced Yair Lapid as permanent presenter of Studio Friday (Hebrew: אולפן שישי – ulpan shishi) after Lapid entered politics. He has also hosted morning television programs and produced several documentaries.

On 1 February 2003, he covered the landing of Space Shuttle Columbia, expected to bring Israel's first astronaut, Ilan Ramon, back to Earth after a lengthy mission. Ramon's father, Eliezer Wolferman, was present in the studio. During the initially festive broadcast, NASA lost contact with the shuttle's crew. After this was clear, Wolferman was sent out of the studio away from camera. Kushmaro announced that the shuttle had disintegrated over Texas, leaving Ramon and his six colleagues dead.

He made a cameo appearance in the American movie Edge of Tomorrow, together with his colleague, reporter Nir Dvori.

In 2017, he interviewed white supremacist Richard Spencer. Afterwards, one viewer published the phone number of the Israeli News Company, so others could criticise the channel for interviewing a neo-Nazi.

In 2018, he covered the torch lighting ceremony on Mount Herzl, the Great March of Return and the inauguration of the US Embassy in Jerusalem.

References

1968 births
Living people
Israeli television presenters
Ben-Gurion University of the Negev alumni
Mass media people from Beersheba
Israeli journalists
Israeli people of Romanian-Jewish descent
Writers from Beersheba